James Klopko is a Canadian cinematographer. He is most noted for his work on the 2019 film A Fire in the Cold Season, for which he received a Canadian Screen Award nomination for Best Cinematography at the 9th Canadian Screen Awards in 2021.

His other credits have included the films Sleeping Giant, Great Great Great, Catch and Release, An Audience of Chairs and The Last Porno Show, and episodes of the television series What Would Sal Do? and Kim's Convenience.

References

External links

Canadian cinematographers
Living people
Year of birth missing (living people)